"I Don't Need to Be You" is a song performed by Spanish singer/songwriter Barei. The song was released in Spain as a digital download on 3 March 2017. The song peaked at number 11 on the Spanish Singles Chart.

Music video
A music video to accompany the release of "I Don't Need to Be You" was first released onto YouTube on 3 March 2017 at a total length of four minutes and twenty-one seconds.

Track listing

Charts

Weekly charts

Release history

References

2017 songs
2017 singles